Machaerium is a genus of flies in the family Dolichopodidae.

Species
Machaerium maritimae Haliday, 1832
Machaerium sordidum Becker, 1908
Machaerium thinophilum (Loew, 1857)

Machaerium henanense Yang & Grootaert, 1999 has been renamed to Nepalomyia hui Yang & Wang, 2006

References

Hydrophorinae
Dolichopodidae genera
Taxa named by Alexander Henry Haliday